Oskardów  is a settlement in the administrative district of Gmina Warka, within Grójec County, Masovian Voivodeship, in east-central Poland.

References

Villages in Grójec County